Gore District is a district in the Southland region of the South Island of New Zealand.

Geography
The Gore District is located in the south of the South Island. The two neighbouring districts are Southland in the west and Clutha in the east. The seat of the district council is in the town of Gore. The district has a population of

Towns and localities

Gore is the main centre of Gore District. Other places in the district include the following, based on wards:

Gore Ward:
 Gore (seat)

Kaiwera-Waimumu Ward:

 Kaiwera Community Board:
 Diamond Peak
 East Gore
 Ferndale
 Kaiwera
 Otaraia
 Tuturau (north part)
 Waikana
 Watarikiki (east part)
 Waimumu Community Board:
 Brydone (north part)
 Charlton
 Croydon
 Croydon Bush
 Otamita
 Te Tipua (north part)
 Upper Charlton
 Waimumu
 Waitane (east part)

Mataura Ward:
 Mataura

Waikaka Ward:

 Arthurton
 Benio
 Chatton
 Chatton North
 East Chatton
 Greenvale
 Knapdale
 Maitland
 Mandeville (south part)
 Merino Downs (west part)
 McNab
 Otama
 Otikerama
 Pukerau
 Te Kiteroa (west part)
 Waikaka
 Waikaka Valley
 Wendon (east part)
 Wendon Valley
 Whiterigg
 Willowbank

Demographics

Gore District had a population of 12,396 at the 2018 New Zealand census, an increase of 363 people (3.0%) since the 2013 census, and an increase of 288 people (2.4%) since the 2006 census. There were 5,076 households. There were 6,153 males and 6,246 females, giving a sex ratio of 0.99 males per female. The median age was 43.6 years (compared with 37.4 years nationally), with 2,373 people (19.1%) aged under 15 years, 2,079 (16.8%) aged 15 to 29, 5,439 (43.9%) aged 30 to 64, and 2,508 (20.2%) aged 65 or older.

Ethnicities were 89.0% European/Pākehā, 12.9% Māori, 1.1% Pacific peoples, 3.1% Asian, and 1.5% other ethnicities. People may identify with more than one ethnicity.

The percentage of people born overseas was 8.8, compared with 27.1% nationally.

Although some people objected to giving their religion, 47.2% had no religion, 43.2% were Christian, 0.4% were Hindu, 0.3% were Muslim, 0.1% were Buddhist and 1.6% had other religions.

Of those at least 15 years old, 1,008 (10.1%) people had a bachelor or higher degree, and 2,883 (28.8%) people had no formal qualifications. The median income was $30,900, compared with $31,800 nationally. 1,197 people (11.9%) earned over $70,000 compared to 17.2% nationally. The employment status of those at least 15 was that 5,121 (51.1%) people were employed full-time, 1,539 (15.4%) were part-time, and 261 (2.6%) were unemployed.

History
The European history of Gore started in 1855 with the arrival of Scottish settlers. After the town site was surveyed, the provincial superintendent, James Alexander Robertson Menzies, named the site for his friend, the Governor of New Zealand, Thomas Gore Browne. The original name of the township, Long Ford or Longford, remained for some time, but when the railway reached the town, the shorter name became common and was also applied to the wider district. The township of Gore was incorporated and became a borough council in 1885.

In the local government reform in 1989, the Gore and Mataura borough councils and parts of Southland County Council were amalgamated to form Gore District.

Governance

The district council is headed by a mayor who is elected at large and complemented by eleven councillors from various wards. Five councillors represent the Gore ward, one councillor each represents the Mataura, Kaiwera-Waimumu, and Waikaka wards, and there is one further district-wide ward that is represented by three councillors. The current mayor, Ben Bell, was elected in the 2022 New Zealand local elections as Gore's youngest mayor at the age of 23 years, defeating the incumbent Tracy Hicks.

Current body
As of 2022, the current council members are:

 Mayor 
 Gore ward: Bronwyn Reid, Bret Highsted, Nick Grant, Glenys Dickson, Doug Grant
 Mataura ward: Neville Phillips
 Waikaka ward: John Gardyne
 Waimumu-Kaiwera ward: Stewart MacDonell
 Councillors elected at-large: Cliff Bolger, Nicky Davis, Richard McPhail

References

External links

 Gore District Council website

 
1989 establishments in New Zealand